Miss de Vère (English Jig) was an 1896 French silent film directed by Georges Méliès. It was released by Méliès's Star Film Company and is numbered 45 in its catalogues. The performer, the "Miss de Vère" of the title, is the dancer and actress Constance Elise de Vere. She was, along with Clementine de Vere, a daughter of Charles de Vere (real name H. S. G. Williams), an Englishman who had worked as a professional magician and who was then the owner of a Paris shop selling conjuror's supplies, electrical equipment, and films.  Constance Elise de Vere, known professionally as Elise de Vere, married Frank Joseph Godsol in Newark, NJ on December 8, 1917.

Miss de Vère in a complete form is currently presumed lost, but a flipbook produced by Léon Beaulieu around 1896–97, rediscovered in the mid-2010s in a private collection, appears to preserve a fragment of the film.

References

External links 
 
 Flipbook on Vimeo, tentatively identified as a fragment on Miss de Vère

1896 films
French silent short films
French black-and-white films
Films directed by Georges Méliès
Lost French films
1890s lost films
1896 short films
1890s French films